W. G. Grace qualified as a doctor in 1879 made his first appearance in Test cricket the following year, scoring the first-ever century by an England batsman.

1879 English cricket season
Grace missed a large part of the 1879 season because he was doing the final practical for his medical qualification and, for the first time since 1869, he did not complete 1000 runs, though he did take 105 wickets.

Grace made 18 first-class appearances in 1879, scoring 993 runs, with a highest score of 123, at an average of 38.19 with 3 centuries and 5 half-centuries. In the field, he took 23 catches and 113 wickets with a best analysis of 8–81. His bowling average was 13.19; he had 5 wickets in an innings 14 times and 10 wickets in a match once.

Having qualified as a doctor in November 1879, Grace had to give priority to his new practice in Bristol for the next five years.  As a result, his cricket sometimes had to be set aside and he had other troubles including a serious bout of mumps in 1882.  From 1879 to 1882, he did not complete 1000 runs in the season.

1880 English cricket season

In addition, Gloucestershire had declined following its heady success in the 1870s.  One of the reasons was the early death of W.G.'s younger brother Fred from pneumonia in 1880, there being a view that "the county was never quite the same without him".  Apart from W.G. himself, the only players of Fred Grace's calibre at this time were the leading professionals.  Unlike the south-east and northern counties, Gloucestershire had neither the large home gates nor the necessary funds that could have secured the services of good quality professionals.  This was at a time when a new generation of professionals was appearing with the likes of Billy Gunn, Maurice Read and Arthur Shrewsbury.  As a result, Gloucestershire fell away in county competition and could no longer match Nottinghamshire, Surrey and Lancashire who had the strongest sides in the 1880s.

Test cricket began in 1877 when Grace was already 28 and he made his debut in 1880, scoring England's first-ever Test century against Australia. He played for England in 22 Tests through the 1880s and 1890s, all of them against Australia, and was an automatic selection for England at home, but his only Test-playing tour of Australia was that of 1891–92.

Grace made 16 first-class appearances in 1880, scoring 951 runs, with a highest score of 152, at an average of 39.62 with 2 centuries and 5 half-centuries. In the field, he took 17 catches and 84 wickets with a best analysis of 7–65. His bowling average was 17.60; he had 5 wickets in an innings 9 times and 10 wickets in a match 3 times.

1881 English cricket season
Grace made 13 first-class appearances in 1881, scoring 917 runs, with a highest score of 182, at an average of 38.20 with 2 centuries and 5 half-centuries. In the field, he took 20 catches and 57 wickets with a best analysis of 7–30. His bowling average was 18.00; he had 5 wickets in an innings 3 times.

1882 English cricket season
Grace's most significant Test was England v Australia in 1882 at The Oval.  Thanks to Spofforth who took 14 wickets in the match, Australia won by 7 runs and the legend of The Ashes was born immediately afterwards.  Grace scored only 4 and 32 but he has been held responsible for "firing up" Spofforth.  This came about through a typical piece of gamesmanship by Grace when he effected an unsporting, albeit legal, run out of Sammy Jones.

Grace made 22 first-class appearances in 1882, scoring 975 runs, with a highest score of 88, at an average of 26.35 with 0 centuries and 8 half-centuries. In the field, he took 22 catches and 101 wickets with a best analysis of 8–31. His bowling average was 17.34; he had 5 wickets in an innings 8 times and 10 wickets in a match twice.

References

External links
 CricketArchive – W.G. Grace

Bibliography

 
 
 
 
 
 
 
 
 

English cricket seasons in the 19th century
1879